Marcin Kaczmarek may refer to:

 Marcin Kaczmarek (swimmer) (born 1977), retired butterfly swimmer from Poland
 Marcin Kaczmarek (footballer, born 1979), Polish footballer
 Marcin Kaczmarek (footballer, born 1974), Polish former footballer and now manager